Mystic River is a novel by Dennis Lehane that was published in 2001. It won the 2002 Dilys Award and was made into an Academy Award-winning film in 2003.

Plot summary
The novel revolves around three boys who grow up as friends in Boston — Dave Boyle, Sean Devine, and Jimmy Marcus. When the story opens, Dave is abducted by child molesters while he, Sean, and Jimmy are horsing around on a neighborhood street. Dave escapes and returns home days later, emotionally shattered by his experience. The book then moves forward 25 years: Sean has become a homicide detective, Jimmy is an ex-convict who currently owns a convenience store, and Dave is a shell of a man. Jimmy's daughter disappears and is found brutally murdered in a city park, and that same night, Dave comes home to his wife, covered in blood. Sean is assigned to investigate the murder, and the three childhood friends are caught up in each other's lives again.

Film adaptation
Mystic River, the Academy Award-winning adaptation of the novel, was released in 2003. The film was directed by Clint Eastwood and starred Sean Penn as Jimmy Markum (the character's last name was changed from Marcus to Markum for the film), Tim Robbins as Dave, and Kevin Bacon as Sean. Sean Penn won the Best Actor in a Leading Role and Tim Robbins won the Best Supporting Actor for their respective performances. It was also nominated for four other Academy Awards: Best Picture, Best Director (Eastwood), Best Supporting Actress (Marcia Gay Harden), and Best Adapted Screenplay (Brian Helgeland).

Awards and nominations
Mystic River won the 2002 Dilys Award presented by the Independent Mystery Booksellers Association. The same year, it also won the Massachusetts Book Award.

Notes

2001 American novels
Novels by Dennis Lehane
American novels adapted into films
Novels set in Boston
Anthony Award-winning works
Barry Award-winning works
Dilys Award-winning works
Books with cover art by Chip Kidd